Hypochrosis suffusata is a moth of the family Geometridae first described by Arnold Pagenstecher in 1907. It is found in south western Madagascar.

It has a wingspan of 28 mm.

References

Hypochrosini
Moths of Madagascar
Moths of Africa